The 2009 Suwon Samsung Bluewings season was the Suwon Samsung Bluewings' fourteenth season in the South Korean K-League. The club participated in the K-League, League Cup, Korean FA Cup, Pan-Pacific Championship and the Champions League as the winners of the previous year's K-League.

Squad

Backroom Staff

Coaching Staff
Head coach:  Cha Bum-Kun
Assistant coach:  Lee Lim-Saeng 
Coach:  Kim Jin-woo
Reserve Team Coach:  Choi Man-Hee
GK Coach:  Cho Byung-Deuk
Physical trainer:  George Daniel Meyer

Scouter
 Kim Soon-Ki
 Hwang Deuk-Ha

Honours

Club
Korean FA Cup Winners
Pan-Pacific Championship Winners

Individual
Korean FA Cup MVP:  Lee Woon-Jae

References

External links
 Suwon Bluewings Official website

Suwon Samsung Bluewings seasons
Suwon Samsung Bluewings